The Constitution of Kyrgyzstan is the supreme law of the Kyrgyz Republic. Kyrgyzstan first got a constitution in 1993, a year and a half after the country had gained independence from the Soviet Union in 1991. It has gone through a few constitutions, with the last one being adopted in April 2021.

History

1993 constitution 
The first constitution was adopted on 5 May 1993.

The 1993 constitution was amended several times: first on 10 February 1996, then on 2 February 2003, and finally twice in quick succession on 9 November 2006 and 15 January 2007 after the Tulip Revolution of March 2005. The last two amendments were adopted under pressure from protracted public protests in the capital Bishkek, but they were annulled in September 2007 by the Constitutional Court, which restored the 2003 constitution and paved the way for another constitutional referendum in October 2007.

2007 constitution

2010 constitution

2021 constitution 
The current constitution of Kyrgyzstan was passed by referendum on 11 April 2021, replacing the 2010 Constitution of Kyrgyzstan. It reintroduced a strong president to the country, reducing the power of the legislative branch. Will Partlett describes the new constitution as making structural changes that "move Kyrgyzstan away from a checks-and-balances system of semi-presidentialism toward a form of presidentialism that is close to the authoritarian-style 'crown-presidentialism' in the post-Soviet Eurasian space."

References

External links
 Full text of the constitution in Kyrgyz on the government website

Kyrgyzstan
Law of Kyrgyzstan
Government of Kyrgyzstan